Dmitriyevka is a rural locality (a village) in Pervomaysky Selsoviet, Meleuzovsky District, Bashkortostan, Russia. The population was 5 as of 2010.

Geography 
It is located 12 km from Meleuz, 5 km from Pervomayskaya.

References 

Rural localities in Meleuzovsky District